María Paredes  (born ) is a retired Argentine female volleyball player, who played as a wing spiker.

She was part of the Argentina women's national volleyball team at the 2003 FIVB Volleyball World Grand Prix.

At club level she played for Boca Juniors

References

1966 births
Living people
Argentine women's volleyball players